Nanjing Foreign Language School (NFLS) is a middle and high school located in Xuanwu District, Nanjing, Jiangsu, People's Republic of China. It was established in 1963 under the direction of Zhou Enlai, the first Premier of PRC, and is one of the oldest foreign language schools in China. Its mottos are "Chinese Soul, Global Vision" and "Seek the truth, Scale the height, Be erudite, Be modest".

History

Establishment and Early History 
Starting from the mid 1950s, the Chinese Government recognized its shortage of diplomats with strong language potency. To address this issue, a number of foreign language schools were established in major cities of China under the direction of Prime Minister Zhou Enlai, aiming to cultivate the diplomatic talents in demand. One of these schools was the then Jiangsu Labor and Farmer Instant High School, which was renamed Nanjing Foreign Language School upon its re-establishment in 1963. The instant high school, which had served as a pre-college training school for cadres, had better faculties and facilities than other secondary schools in Nanjing, paving a good foundation for the development of Nanjing Foreign Language School. There were students of three different grades in the school's first Class: the 3rd grade, selected from various elementary schools in Nanjing; the 7th grade, admitted from current year graduates; and the 10th grade, who had already studied German and French in the No.11 Middle School. The school was established as a boarding school, which was rare among Chinese elementary and secondary schools, in order to foster a better environment for language learning.

The campus was originally a Japanese military camp during the Second Sino-Japanese War, with three quadrangles for soldiers, a western-style mansion for officers, and a training ground. Dormitories, a three-story teaching building, and a ceremony hall were added during the instant high school period. In 1965, a new main teaching building was constructed, which was called "The Car Building" by students and faculties due to its shape resembling a truck.

Development 
Despite its advantages over other high schools in facilities and support, the school's early development was largely restrained by economic and educational limitations in China. Teaching buildings with modern teaching facilities were not available, and "non-built-up" areas, such as woods, pond, river, and agricultural lands, were still part of the campus. However, NFLS managed to maintain an advanced education philosophy that focused more on "quality-oriented education", especially regarding foreign language education.

School Structure 
Nanjing Foreign Language School consists of a three-year middle school and a three-year high school offering the National Curriculum. In addition to the National Curriculum, NFLS also offers three international programs, including the International Baccalaureate, GCE A-Level, and BCA program.

The current principal is Zou Zheng.

As of 2019, NFLS has established several branch schools in Nanjing and around Jiangsu Province:

 NFLS Xianlin Campus, established in 2002 in collaboration with Nanjing Government, twelve-year private boarding school;
 NFLS Hexi Campus, established in June 2012, three-year public middle school;
 Nanjing Pukou Foreign Language School, established in August 2012, nine-year public school;
 NFLS Fangshan Campus, established in 2018, twelve-year private school;
 NFLS Huai'an campus; operational from 2018-2019 onward with classes from the preschool to high school levels.

A new campus at Daxiaochang in the city south is currently under construction, and is scheduled to complete in 2022.

Nanjing Foreign Language School has provided A-Level courses since 2006. It also has a program working with most of the 20 top universities in Australia and another program with some top 20 universities in Canada. Now NFLSers are studying or living in over 30 countries.

Admissions 
Widely recognized as one of the best middle/high schools in Nanjing, admission to NFLS is highly selective.

Junior School admissions 
Elementary graduates apply to Nanjing Foreign Language School by taking an interview. Initial application for interview is available for all elementary graduates in Nanjing, who are also free to choose the language of study after admission, which includes: English, French, German, Japanese and Spanish. The interview is not held in these languages though. The total enrollment number is usually 380, and the number of students qualified for interview is 8 times the enrollment number, around 3,200. An open computer allocation carried out by the Student Recruitment Committee Office of Nanjing will be needed if the number of students applying for interview exceeds the expected qualification number. The eligible applicants then take a school-organized interview on English capabilities to determine the final qualification. Contents of the interview are officially declared to be restricted within course contents of standard elementary school textbooks. Various subjects, in fact, are tested, notably English language and Mathematics. Detailed test questions in the interview are not officially open to public. The final qualification is based on results of the interview, each language with a specific admission line. The enrollment number of students who choose English is approximately 330 and varies among different years, while admissions for each "minor" languages usually do not exceed 20.

Before 1998, the school admission process involved two rounds of competition each year. In the first round, pupils compete within their resident districts of the city, and then about 1000 of them in total were selected for the next round. The chosen applicants were  required to take an entrance exam to test their verbal and math skills. Only 200 top candidates could be admitted.

From 1998 to 2002, the first round of competition was abolished, because it was considered to be unfair to students in different city districts.  Therefore, pupils who were going to graduate could freely sign up for the entrance exam. The response was overwhelming with thousands of pupils eagerly joining the competition each year. In 2002, the number of applicants was more than 10,000. Around 150 students was selected for admission with full financial aid, with another 150 selected for partial aid or self-sponsored enrollment.

Recruitment of top students in such a large scale for a high school was unprecedented in Nanjing, and residents in Nanjing gradually formed a habit of judging the quality of an elementary school by looking at how many of its students could be admitted to NFLS, which sparked a high degree of controversy.  For a long time, elementary school teachers and some parents were being criticized for placing too much pressure on students, and the fierce competition for entering NFLS obviously made the situation worse. Furthermore, other top high schools contending for talented students complained about NFLS's unfair practice and accused the city's education council for being partial to NFLS. 

In order to relive pupils' burden of taking exams, some people suggested that the number of students allowed to take the entrance exams of NFLS should be strictly limited, and each elementary school should recommend several students who had good performance not only in exams but also in extracurricular activities. However, this idea was considered to be unrealistic, because the selection criteria were too vague and impractical, and might easily cause unfairness for schools and individual pupils. 

In 2003, an even more controversial admission policy was carried out.  Since 2003, the school is still allowed for citywide recruitment, but with an additional preliminary random allocation procedure executed by a computer.

For instance, assume for year 2009 the number of applicants is 4,000 and the number of planned admits is 300, then only 300*8=2400 applicants are actually allowed to proceed to take the entrance exam, always multiplied by a factor of 8. The 2,400 candidates would be randomly selected among the 4,000 applicants by a computer algorithm, with high degree of public supervision. This new policy destroyed the decision power of exams, and allowed more room for other schools to select good students, but aroused serious arguments concerning the fairness for individual students.

Senior School admissions 
For students from junior high school of NFLS, enrollment qualifications are determined by a combination of standard High School Admission Examination(Zhongkao) in Nanjing and a school-held language examination. Students' combined scores of the two examinations are ranked, and the top 320 students are qualified for high school enrollment. Admissions from other junior high schools to NFLS has two options:

 Applicants take another language test different from that for on-campus students, whose score, combined with the Zhongkao score, are used to determine qualification. 
 Applicants participate in a school-organized test on STEM capabilities. Only very limited number of students are admitted in this way in different subjects. This option is also shared with students from NFLS junior school.

Before 2003, the senior high school of NFLS only enrolled students from its own middle school, with a small number of elimination. Since 2003, students from other middle schools can also apply and compete for the entrance to NFLS, by taking the city's public exams and an additional English language test.

Facilities 
The school's library includes a main library and foreign language reading rooms. There is a laboratory for experiments and curriculum in STEM elective courses, including a UV spectroscope, IR spectroscope, TGA, HPLC, HP-MS, and an elemental analyzer. Engineering workshops are available to students taking selective courses or upon request, equipped with roboting facilities and 3D printers. The School Stadium has facilities for sports, including table tennis, indoor basketball, gym, badminton field, volleyball and others.

Academics 
Nanjing Foreign Language School employs the standard education system of Jiangsu Province in disciplines other than foreign languages. Students may select one from English, German, French and Japanese as their major language as early as their applications for admission. Comparing to the other languages, English is the major choice, consisting approximately 330 students in a grade. Enrollments of minor languages are controlled to be around 20 students for each language, and the admission score line in the interview vary correspondingly, as mentioned above.

Comparing with other middle schools, numbers of language lessons rise to 10 classes per week, including one class given by foreign teachers for almost every grade. Language courses in NFLS are smaller in class size than other courses, with only 20-30 students; small-size classrooms are also specially designed for such class model. For English courses, junior high school students use special textbooks instead of standard textbooks in China, while students in senior high school use  New Concept English 3.

NFLS is reputed as a highly competitive school, at least in Nanjing. As of 2019, all 19 students taking Gaokao attained scores above the first standard score; Average score in Zhongkao was 620 out of 700.

Various selective courses are available for all students. Topics range from liberal arts to STEM, from sporting to lectures, and from Olympiad training to cartoon design. Students are recommended to take 1-2 selective courses, but not as a compulsory. Some courses are certified international course programs, such as FHAO courses; others are generally school-based courses, such as STEM courses, debate, and MUN.

Olympiads 
NFLS has strong coaching resources in various fields, notably Mathematics, Physics, and CS, which contributed to a considerable number of students excelling in STEM competitions. By far, students from NFLS has won 9 gold medals in international STEM Olympiads (IPhO 1996, 2012, IChO 2008, IOI 2005, 2006, 2009, 2013, 2013, 2019). In year 2019 alone, 6 students have been selected into national Olympiad teams (IOI 1, IYPT 2, ISIJ 1, ILO 2).

Notable alumni 
 Zhu Bangzao, ambassador of China to Tunisia (2002 - 2003), ambassador of China to Switzerland (2004 - 2008), ambassador of China to Spain (2009 - 2014)
 Lu Shaye (1982), ambassador of China to Senegal (2006 - 2009), ambassador of China to Canada (2017 - 2019), Chinese Ambassador to France and Monaco (2019 - )
 Liu Mingyan (1991), Peter and Evelyn Fuss Chair of Electrical and Computer Engineering, University of Michigan
 Sun Ning (1999), translator of Xi Jinping
 Zhang Zetian (2011), businesswoman who married to Liu Qiangdong, CEO of JD.com.

See also 
 List of Foreign Language Schools in China
 Notable High Schools in Nanjing

External links

Notes 

High schools in Nanjing
Foreign-language high schools in China
International Baccalaureate schools in China
Educational institutions established in 1963
1963 establishments in China